Leinach is a municipality in the district of Würzburg in Bavaria in Germany. It includes the villages of Unterleinach and Oberleinach.

References

Würzburg (district)